Piaski is a village in Gostyń County, Greater Poland Voivodeship, in west-central Poland. It is the seat of the gmina (administrative district) called Gmina Piaski.

The village has a population of 3,040.

Historically, the town had a large Jewish population, partially because for many years Jews were not permitted in the nearby town of Gostyń. Over time, this restriction was relaxed, and many of the families who remained in the area relocated. However, the late 19th century was a time of great emigration, as anti-Semitic rules and regulations were reestablished. The last Jewish family in the area of Gostyń / Piaski was that of Ewald Jacubowski, who moved to Germany (later Brazil) in 1927

References 

Villages in Gostyń County

fr:Piaski (gmina de Grande-Pologne)